Mesocolpia consobrina is a moth in the family Geometridae first described by William Warren in 1901. It is found on São Tomé Island (the type locality), Angola, DR Congo, Kenya, Nigeria, Sierra Leone and South Africa.

Subspecies
Mesocolpia consobrina consobrina
Mesocolpia consobrina sylleptria (Prout, 1937)

References

External links

Moths described in 1901
Eupitheciini
Insects of West Africa
Moths of São Tomé and Príncipe
Moths of Africa